Rudolf Landolt (born 31 October 1957) is a retired Swiss football defender.

References

1957 births
Living people
Swiss men's footballers
FC Zürich players
Association football defenders
Swiss Super League players
Switzerland under-21 international footballers